Captain Sir Henry Onslow, 2nd Baronet (23 April 1784 – 13 September 1853) was a British baronet and son of Sir Richard Onslow, 1st Baronet, whose baronetcy he succeeded on 27 December 1817. He was also Captain in the Royal Artillery.

Onslow was born at Bramdean, Hampshire on 23 April 1784, the seventh and youngest child of Admiral Sir Richard Onslow.
Onslow married Caroline Bond and had four daughters and five sons, including the third and fourth Baronets. He died on 13 September 1853 at Steyning, West Sussex, and is buried in the churchyard at All Saints parish church, Chitterne, Wiltshire.<

1784 births
1853 deaths
Baronets in the Baronetage of Great Britain
Royal Artillery officers
Henry